Oberhasli may refer to:
 Oberhasli, a historical region in the Bernese Oberland in the canton of Berne, Switzerland
 Oberhasli District, a former district
 Oberhasli (goat), a breed of goat named after the Bernese district
 Oberhasli, a settlement of the municipality Niederhasli, Zurich canton, Switzerland

See also
Hasli (disambiguation)